Alexandria National Cemetery is the name of two US National Cemeteries:

Alexandria National Cemetery (Alexandria, Virginia), in Virginia
Alexandria National Cemetery (Alexandria, Louisiana), in Louisiana, listed on the NRHP